The 2016 Copa do Brasil Third Round was played from 6 July to 28 July 2016 deciding the 10 teams that advanced to the knockout rounds. Different than the first two rounds, in this round the away team that wins the first match by 2 or more goals do not progress straight to the next round avoiding the second leg. The order of the matches was determined by a random draw.

Matches

|}

Match 61

Santos won 3–0 on aggregate.

Match 62

Botafogo won 3–0 on aggregate

Match 63

Vasco da Gama won 4–3 on aggregate.

Match 64

Cruzeiro won 4–2 on aggregate.

Match 65

Juventude won 2–1 on aggregate.

Match 66

Tied 1–1 on aggregate, Atlético Paranaense won on away goals.

Match 67

Fortaleza won 4–2 on aggregate.

Match 68

Fluminense won 3–1 on aggregate.

Match 69

Ponte Preta won 5–0 on aggregate.

Match 70

Botafogo won 3–2 on aggregate.

References

2016 Copa do Brasil